National Council may refer to:

Conservation

 National Council for Science and the Environment, a US-based non-profit organization which has a mission to improve the scientific basis for environmental decision-making
 National Council for the Conservation of Plants and Gardens, former name of Plant Heritage, a British registered charity

Economics

 National Competitiveness Council, an independent policy advisory body in the Republic of Ireland
 National Council of Welfare, a Canadian citizens' body
 National Council on Economic Education, a nationwide non-profit organization that leads in promoting economic and financial literacy
 National Economic Action Council, a main governing body which solved the economic crisis in Malaysia between 1996 and 1998
 National Economic Development Council, a corporatist economic planning forum set up in the 1962 in the United Kingdom to bring together management, trades unions and government in an attempt to address Britain's relative economic decline

Education

 Kenya National Examinations Council, the national body responsible for overseeing national examination in Kenya
 National Assessment and Accreditation Council, an autonomous body funded by University Grants Commission of Government of India based in Bangalore
 National Council for Accreditation of Teacher Education, a council of educators created to ensure and raise the quality of preparation for their profession
 National Council for the Social Studies, a US-based association devoted to supporting social studies education
 National Council for the Training of Journalists, an organisation that oversees the training of journalists for the newspaper industry in the United Kingdom
 National Council of Examiners for Engineering and Surveying, a national non-profit organization composed of engineering and land surveying licensing boards representing all U.S. states and territories
 National Council on Education for the Ceramic Arts, the most influential organization in the United States promoting ceramics as an art form
 National Council on Educational Reform, a governmental organization in Japan
 National Council for Teacher Education,  a governmental organization in India
 National Council on Teacher Quality, a Washington D.C.-based think tank that advocates for tougher teacher evaluations

Politics

 Codava National Council, a political party in the Indian state of Karnataka
 Estonian National Council, one of the oldest and largest Estonian central organisations in Sweden
 Garo National Council, a political party in Meghalaya, India
 Iraqi National Dialogue Council, a Sunni Arab political party initially established as an umbrella organization of approximately 10 smaller Sunni parties to take part in the 2005 Iraqi Constitution drafting process
 Jewish National Council, executive body of the Jewish community in Mandatory Palestine
 National Advisory Council (NAC) of India, an advisory body set up, during the First and Second Manmohan Singh ministries to monitor the implementation of the United Progressive Alliance government's manifesto
 National Councils in Poland existed from 1952 till the end of the People's Republic of Poland as local government institutions
 National Council for the Defense of Democracy, a former ethnic Hutu rebel group that now functions as a political party in Burundi
 National Council of Administration, a former executive body in Uruguay (1919–1933)
 National Council of La Raza, a non-profit, non-partisan political advocacy group in the United States, now known as UnidosUS
 National Council of Nigeria and the Cameroons, a Nigerian political party from 1944 to 1966
 National Council of Resistance of Iran, an Iranian exile organisation
 National Council of the Union of Burma, a liberal resistance organisation in Myanmar
 National Council of Venezuelan Indians, a political party in Venezuela
 National Council of Women's Organizations, an American non-profit political organization headed by Martha Burk
 National Electoral Council (Venezuela), the institution in charge of all electoral processes that take place in Venezuela
 National Operations Council, an emergency administrative body which attempted to restore law and order in Malaysia after the May 13 Incident in 1969
 National Peace Keeping Council, a Thai military junta that overthrew the civilian elected government of Chatichai Choonhavan in 1991
 United African National Council, a party led by Abel Muzorewa

Legislative bodies 
 Federal National Council, the legislature of the United Arab Emirates
 National Council, the second chamber of the National Assembly of Estonia from 1938 to 1940
 National Council (Austria), one of the two houses of the Austrian parliament
 National Council (Bhutan), the upper chamber of the parliament of the Kingdom of Bhutan
 National Council (Greece), short-lived legislative body convened by the National Liberation Front in Greece in May 1944
 Czech National Council
 National Council (Monaco), the parliament of the Principality of Monaco
 National Council (Namibia), the upper chamber of the country's bicameral Parliament
 National Council (Nepal), a national legislature
 National Council of Provinces, the upper house of the Parliament of South Africa under the constitution which came into full effect in 1997
 National Council (Switzerland), the large Chamber of the parliament
 National Council (Slovakia), the parliament of Slovakia since 1 October 1992
 National Council of Turkmenistan, a defunct parliament of Turkmenistan
 Palestinian National Council, the parliament in exile of the Palestinian people
 Provisional National Defence Council, the Ghanaian government after the People's National Party's elected government was overthrown by Jerry Rawlings
 Sahrawi National Council, the legislature of the government in exile of the Sahrawi Arab Democratic Republic
 State National Council, a parliament-like political body formed in the late stages of the Second World War in the Soviet Union

Unification
 National Unification Advisory Council, a constitutional governmental organization to advise the President of South Korea on the formulation of Korean peaceful unification policy
 National Unification Council, a governmental body in the Republic of China on Taiwan whose aim is to promote unification with Mainland China

Racial reconciliation

 Chinese Canadian National Council, an organization whose purpose is to monitor racial discrimination against Chinese in Canada
 Métis National Council, a national representative of the Métis people in Canada
 National Council for Combating Discrimination, an agency of the Romanian government
 National Council of American–Soviet Friendship, the successor organisation to the National Council on Soviet Relations
 National Council on Canada-Arab Relations, a non-profit organization dedicated to building bridges of understanding and cooperation between Canada and the Arab world

Religion

 National Council of Churches, a religious organization consisting of 35 Protestant, Anglican, Orthodox, African-American and historic Christian denominations in the United States
 National Council of Churches in Australia, an ecumenical organisation bringing together a number of Australia's Christian churches in dialogue and practical cooperation
 National Council on Bible Curriculum in Public Schools, a nonprofit organization that promotes the use of its 300-page Bible curriculum in schools throughout the United States

Science

 National Science Council, the main governmental promotion and funding body for science research in Taiwan
 National Scientific and Technical Research Council, an Argentine government agency which directs and co-ordinates most of the scientific and technical research done in public universities and institutes

Social aid

 National Council of Women of Australia, an Australian organization founded in 1931
 National Council on Alcoholism and Drug Dependence, an American organization
 National Council on Compensation Insurance, a U.S. insurance rating and data collection bureau specializing in workers compensation
 National Council on Disability, an advisory board within the Department of Education
 National Council on Problem Gambling (Singapore), a council set up in Singapore on 31 August 2005 to address problem gambling
 National Temperance Council, a 1913 establishment

Unionization

 National Council of Trade Unions, a national trade union center in South Africa
 National Council of Unions of the Industrial and Lower Income Group of Government Workers, a national trade union center in Malaysia

Volunteering
 Boy Scouts of America National Council
 National Council for Voluntary Organisations, the umbrella body for the voluntary sector in England
 National Council of Jewish Women, a volunteer organization
 National Council of Negro Women, a voluntary non-profit membership organization with the mission to advance the opportunities and the quality of life for African American women, their families and communities

Other

 Australian National Kennel Council, the peak body in Australia responsible for promoting excellence in breeding, showing, trialling, obedience, and other canine-related activities
 Greek National Council for Radio and Television, an independent supervisory and regulatory administrative authority of the radio and television market
 National Advertising Review Council, former name of Advertising Self-Regulatory Council, an organization based in New York US that provides self-regulatory services to the American advertising industry
 National Chicken Council, the non-profit trade association representing the U.S. chicken industry
 National Council (Slovenia), the constitutional representative of social, economic, professional and local interest groups
 National Council for the Defense of Democracy – Forces for the Defense of Democracy, the most significant rebel group active in the Burundi Civil War
 National Council for the Maltese Language, an associate member of the European Federation of National Institutions for Language in the EU
 National Council for the Traditional Arts, a private, non-profit arts organization based in the United States that promotes the traditional arts
 National Council of Architectural Registration Boards, the professional association of architectural registration boards of the various states in the United States
 National Council on Radiation Protection and Measurements, a U.S. organization which seeks to formulate and widely disseminate information, guidance and recommendations on radiation protection
 National Crime Prevention Council, an American educational nonprofit organization whose mission is to enable people to create safer and more caring communities by addressing the causes of crime and violence
 National Fire Information Council, a United States agency that encourages and perpetuates the use of a standardized national incident reporting system as a means of addressing the nation's fire problem and related emergency services issues
 National Foreign Trade Council, a US-based business lobby group for free trade and multinational corporations
 National House Building Council, the National House Builders Registration Council in the United Kingdom
 National Intelligence Council, the center for midterm and long-term strategic thinking within the United States Intelligence Community
 National Multicultural Greek Council, an umbrella council for thirteen Multicultural Greek Letter Organizations established in 1998
 National Pan-Hellenic Council, an umbrella organization for nine historically-black, international Greek letter fraternities and sororities
 National Peace Council, the co-ordinating body for almost 200 groups across Britain
 National Safety Council, a not-for-profit safety organization that was chartered by the US government in 1913
 Singapore National Olympic Council, a registered society
 National Council Against Health Fraud, a US-based organization

See also

 Armenian National Council
 National Arts Council (disambiguation)
 National Council of Government (disambiguation)
 National Council of Teachers (disambiguation)
 National Economic Council (disambiguation)
 National Research Council (disambiguation)
 National security council
 National Youth Council (disambiguation)